Gottfried Christian Reich (19 July 1769 – 5 January 1848) was a German physician and a professor of medicine first at the University of Erlangen and then at Berlin University. He translated several medical works in English to German. He also took an interest in natural history and edited two short-lived periodicals, one on the animal kingdom and another on plants.

Reich was born in the Kaiserhammer hunting lodge at Marktleuthen near Wunsiedel. He studied medicine at Jena and Erlangen and received a doctorate in 1793 for a thesis titled Brevis epidemiae variolosae Arzbergensis anni 1791 delineatio. He then became a professor of medicine at the University of Erlangen. He translated several medical works from English to German and in 1796 he wrote on rinderpest. He also edited periodicals on plants and animals, describing two new insects and a hummingbird species.  He also wrote on fevers and suggested that they were due to chemical causes, specifically an increase in nitrogen and a reduction in oxygen, suggesting the treatment using acids. He claimed that the results were infallible and news of his claim spread widely. The Prussian government requested him to conduct some experiments to demonstrate this at the Charité hospital in Berlin in 1799. The results were published in 1801 and was reviewed favourably, and he was granted a pension. He also gave lectures and moved to Berlin in 1800. He was posted as professor of medicine when Berlin University was founded and he worked there until his death.

References

External links 
 Magazin des Thierreichs 
 Magazin des Pflanzenreichs 
 Mantissae insectorvm iconibvs illvstratae species novas avt nondvm depictas exhibentis (1797)
 On fever and its treatment in general (1801) (English translation by Caleb Hillier Parry) German original
 Die Cholera in Berlin (1831)

1769 births
1848 deaths
German physicians
German naturalists
People from Bavaria